There are two places named Keokea in the U.S. state of Hawaii:

Keokea, Hawaii County, Hawaii
Keokea, Maui County, Hawaii